Viasa Flight 897 was an international scheduled Rome–Madrid–Lisbon–Santa Maria–Caracas passenger service that crashed into the Atlantic Ocean off the coast of Portugal on 30 May 1961, shortly after takeoff from Portela Airport. There were no survivors among the 61 occupants of the aircraft.

Aircraft
Named Fridtjof Nansen, the aircraft involved in the accident was a Douglas DC-8-53, registration PH-DCL, owned by KLM and operated on Viasa's behalf. With constructor's number 45615/131, the airframe was the newest one of the type in KLM's fleet at the time the accident took place; it had accumulated 209 flight hours.

Description
The crash of Viasa Flight 897 occurred on the third leg of a trip that originated in Rome, Italy, and was scheduled to conclude in Caracas, Venezuela. Intermediate stops were to be made in Madrid, Spain, Lisbon, and on Santa Maria Island.

A few minutes after take off the DC-8 entered a spiral dive to the left shortly after sending two short messages to Air Traffic Control. The pilot over-corrected to the right and the aircraft struck the sea with a pitch angle of approximately 25° nose down.

Investigation

The cause for the crash of Viasa Flight 897 was never determined by either Portuguese or Dutch authorities. The official report out of Portugal concluded "Notwithstanding a very thorough, time-consuming investigation, in which many authorities and experts co-operated, it was not possible to establish a probable cause of the accident."

The Netherlands, as state of registry for the aircraft, commented: "Though there are no direct indications in this respect, the Board regards it as possible that the accident was due to the pilot or pilots being misled by instrument failure, in particular of the artificial horizon, or to the pilot having been distracted, so that a serious deviation from the normal flight path was not discovered in time."

Legacy
At the time it occurred, Flight 897 was the third fatal crash of a big jetliner since they were introduced into service in 1958. It was the worst civilian aviation incident ever to take place in Portugal until the crash of TAP Air Portugal Flight 425 in 1977.

See also

Graveyard spiral
Sensory illusions in aviation
Spatial disorientation
Other aircraft that crashed shortly after takeoff, while turning above a dark ocean:
Air India Flight 855
Flash Airlines Flight 604
Pan Am Flight 816

Notes

References

External links
 Final report (Archive) - GPIAA 

897
Aviation accidents and incidents in 1961
Aviation accidents and incidents in Portugal
Airliner accidents and incidents with an unknown cause
Accidents and incidents involving the Douglas DC-8
1961 in Portugal
May 1961 events in Europe
1961 disasters in Portugal